C1orf122 (Chromosome 1 open reading frame 122) is a gene in the human genome that encodes the cytosolic protein ALAESM.. ALAESM is present in all tissue cells and highly up-regulated in the brain, spinal cord, adrenal gland and kidney. This gene can be expressed up to 2.5 times the average gene in its highly expressed tissues. Although the function of C1orf122 is unknown, it is predicted to be used for mitochondria localization.

Gene 
C1orf122 is located on chromosome 1 at 1p34.3. The gene is 1,665 nucleotides long, covering 37,808,405 to 37,809,454. It contains three exons with boundaries between amino acids 12 and 13, and amino acids 79 and 80.

mRNA 
C1orf122 has two isoforms. Variant one contains 1,329 nucleotides with three exons. Variant two contains 1,226 nucleotides with three exons. Variant two lacks an in-frame portion of the 5' coding region, resulting in a shorter N-terminus.

Protein 
ALAESM has a molecular weight of 1100 kDa and an isoelectric point of 6.29. It is a cytosolic protein without a transmembrane domain.

Predicted post-translational modifications 
There are few predicted kinase phosphorylation sites in this protein. Position 7 is predicted to be phosphorylated by CK1, VRK, and VRK2. Position 10 is predicted to be phosphorylated by CRK1, VRK, PKC, PLK, and AGC. Position 82 has a possible phosphorylation by TKL and MLK. Position 94 is predicted to be phosphorylated by PKC, AGC, MAPK, NEK, CMGC and IKK. 

ALAESM does have a few predicted  reactive sites. It is predicted to be palmitoylated at position 10, allowing the covalent attachment of fatty acids. It is predicted to undergo glycation at positions 21 and 101 which attaches a sugar molecule to the amino acid. It is predicted to have a nuclear export signal strand from position 55-64 which signals the protein to leave the nucleus. It likely can be glycosylated at position 82 and 94 which attaches a carbohydrate to the amino acid. It is predicted to be phosphorylated by unsp at position 10, 82, and 94 in the nucleus.

Structure 
The secondary structure of ALAESM is predicted to be structured as 55% random coil, 35% alpha helix and 9% extended strand. There are two alpha helices between positions 11-18 and 36-68. There are three 2 amino acid sections after position 80 and one 4 amino acid section at position 20 of extended strand. The rest of the protein is random coil. There is no transmembrane domain within ALAESM

Expression 
ALAESM is expressed throughout all tissue cells in the body. It is also expressed up to 2.5 times higher than its average level in the brain, spinal cord, adrenal gland and kidneys. The protein is expressed in the cytoplasm and since it is predicted to have a nuclear export signal, it is kept in the cytoplasm even in telophase when the nuclear envelope disassembles.

Homology 

Human C1orf122 does not have any paralogs, however it has multiple orthologs amongst placental mammals. These species range from cats, horses, rabbits, alpacas, and elephants. The sequence across these species are highly conserved.

References 	

Genes on human chromosome 1
Uncharacterized proteins